Statistics of the 1978 Cameroonian Premier League season.

Overview
Union Douala won the championship.

References
Cameroon - List of final tables (RSSSF)

1978 in Cameroonian football
Cam
Cam
Elite One seasons